"Helpless (You Took My Love)" is a song recorded by The Flirts, a New York-based female vocal trio created by Bobby Orlando, an American musician, songwriter and producer.

Background 
The song was written and produced by Bobby Orlando.

Charts

Weekly charts

References 

1984 songs
1984 singles
The Flirts songs
Songs written by Bobby Orlando
Song recordings produced by Bobby Orlando